The 2011–12 Grambling State Tigers men's basketball team represented Grambling State University in the 2011–12 NCAA Division I men's basketball season. The Tigers, led by third-year head coach Robert Washington, played their home games at the Fredrick C. Hobdy Assembly Center in Grambling, Louisiana as members of the Southwestern Athletic Conference (SWAC). They finished the season 4–24, 4–14 in SWAC play to finish in last place. The Tigers had received a one-year postseason ban in May 2011 due to poor academic performance and thus failed to quality for the 2012 SWAC tournament. It was Washington's final season as head coach for the Tigers as he was dismissed on March 19, 2012.

Roster

References

Grambling State Tigers men's basketball seasons
Grambling State Tigers
Grambling State Tigers men's basketball
Grambling State Tigers men's basketball